Catalan Solidarity may refer to:

 Catalan Solidarity (1906)
 Catalan Solidarity (1980)
 Catalan Solidarity for Independence